The MV Prestige was an oil tanker owned by a Greek company based in Athens and operating under a Bahamian flag, that on 19 November 2002 sank off the coast of Galicia, Spain. The sinking caused a major environmental disaster, polluting thousands of miles of coastline with 50,000 tonnes of oil.

Design and construction

The ship was launched on 10 December 1975  and completed on 30 March 1976 by Hitachi Shipbuilding and Engineering Co. in Maizuru, Kyoto, Japan. At the time of its sinking, it was owned by Mare Shipping, and registered in the Bahamas.

See also
 Prestige oil spill
 List of oil spills worldwide
 Plataforma Nunca Máis
 Urquiola: another oil tanker that sank off the Galician coast in 1976
 Aegean Sea: another oil tanker that sank off the Galician coast in 1992

References

External links
 Prestige at the Ministry of the Sea (Galicia) (Xunta de Galicia)
 The Prestige: one year on, a continuing disaster a report by the World Wide Fund for Nature
 Prestige Ship Structure Case Study

Oil tankers
Ships built by Hitachi Zosen Corporation
Shipwrecks of Spain
1975 ships
Maritime incidents in 2002